Acrobelione reverberii is a species of crustacean isopod in the genus Acrobelione.

References 

Cymothoida
Crustaceans described in 1970